The arrondissement of Douai is an arrondissement of France in the Nord department in the Hauts-de-France region. It has 64 communes.

Composition

The communes of the arrondissement of Douai, and their INSEE codes, are:

 Aix-en-Pévèle (59004)
 Anhiers (59007)
 Aniche (59008)
 Arleux (59015)
 Auberchicourt (59024)
 Aubigny-au-Bac (59026)
 Auby (59028)
 Auchy-lez-Orchies (59029)
 Beuvry-la-Forêt (59080)
 Bouvignies (59105)
 Bruille-lez-Marchiennes (59113)
 Brunémont (59115)
 Bugnicourt (59117)
 Cantin (59126)
 Courchelettes (59156)
 Coutiches (59158)
 Cuincy (59165)
 Dechy (59170)
 Douai (59178)
 Écaillon (59185)
 Erchin (59199)
 Erre (59203)
 Esquerchin (59211)
 Estrées (59214)
 Faumont (59222)
 Féchain (59224)
 Fenain (59227)
 Férin (59228)
 Flers-en-Escrebieux (59234)
 Flines-lez-Raches (59239)
 Fressain (59254)
 Gœulzin (59263)
 Guesnain (59276)
 Hamel (59280)
 Hornaing (59314)
 Lallaing (59327)
 Lambres-lez-Douai (59329)
 Landas (59330)
 Lauwin-Planque (59334)
 Lécluse (59336)
 Lewarde (59345)
 Loffre (59354)
 Marchiennes (59375)
 Marcq-en-Ostrevent (59379)
 Masny (59390)
 Monchecourt (59409)
 Montigny-en-Ostrevent (59414)
 Nomain (59435)
 Orchies (59449)
 Pecquencourt (59456)
 Râches (59486)
 Raimbeaucourt (59489)
 Rieulay (59501)
 Roost-Warendin (59509)
 Roucourt (59513)
 Saméon (59551)
 Sin-le-Noble (59569)
 Somain (59574)
 Tilloy-lez-Marchiennes (59596)
 Villers-au-Tertre (59620)
 Vred (59629)
 Wandignies-Hamage (59637)
 Warlaing (59642)
 Waziers (59654)

History

The arrondissement of Douai was created in 1800.

As a result of the reorganisation of the cantons of France which came into effect in 2015, the borders of the cantons are no longer related to the borders of the arrondissements. The cantons of the arrondissement of Douai were, as of January 2015:

 Arleux
 Douai-Nord
 Douai-Nord-Est
 Douai-Sud
 Douai-Sud-Ouest
 Marchiennes
 Orchies

Sub-prefects 
 Joseph Masclet (1 Vendémiaire an XII, 24 September 1803)

References

Douai
French Flanders
Douai